Dur Baba is a district in the southeast of Nangarhar Province, Afghanistan, bordering Pakistan. The district centre is the village of Dur Baba. The population was 29,197 in 2002. The district is within the heartland of the Shinwari tribe of Pashtuns.

References

External links
 Map of Dur Baba (PDF)

Districts of Nangarhar Province